Savannah Rose Welch (born August 4, 1984) is an American actress, musician and podcast host. She is best known for her work in the feature films Boyhood, The Tree of Life, the ABC series The Good Doctor, and the History Channel drama SIX. Welch is also a member of the alt-country band The Trishas.

Early life and education
Welch is the daughter of singer-songwriter Kevin Welch.

She attended UT Austin and studied film for a year, then dropped out to pursue film production and acting.

Career

Acting
Welch's first significant acting role was in 2005, in the independent film Jumping Off Bridges, directed by Kat Candler. She went on to appear in higher profile projects including drama Boyhood directed by Richard Linklater. She also had a role in The Tree of Life, written and directed by Terrence Malick. She would work with Malick again in 2017's Song to Song.

In 2013, Welch appeared with her band The Trishas in two films. For her role in Billy Bates, The Trishas played her backup band, and contributed to the soundtrack. The Trishas also appeared as a band in Angels Sing.

In 2018, Welch played the role of ex-Marine Dawn who lost her leg in an IED explosion in the second season of the History Channel's drama series SIX. Her character meets Alex Caulder (Kyle Schmid), one of the main characters of the Navy SEAL Team, while undergoing physical therapy. While shooting, Welch marked the one-year anniversary of her real-life accident.

Welch portrayed Barbara Gordon in the third season of the HBO Max series Titans in 2021.

In 2022, she appeared as recurring character Dr. Danica Powell on season six of ABC's medical drama The Good Doctor.

Music
Although she grew up in a musical family, Welch did not sing publicly until 2005's “Chip Off the Old Block” SIMS Foundation fundraiser hosted by the Braun Brothers (Reckless Kelly, Micky and the Motorcars).

She would not sing publicly again until the 2009 MusicFest in Steamboat Springs, Colorado. A tribute concert to her father, Kevin Welch, brought her together with 3 other independent artists: Liz Foster, Jamie Lin Wilson, and Kelley Mickwee. They would go on the form the alt-country girl group The Trishas.

Podcast
Welch began recording her KUT NPR local podcast Enough About Music at Austin venue Cactus Cafe. Her first guest was Kevin Russell of Shinyribs. The only rule with her guests is to talk about anything at all, except music.

Personal life
Welch has a son, Charlie (born in 2012).

On November 2, 2016, Welch was at a farmer's market in Wimberley, Texas with her father and 4-year-old son when a vehicle hit her. Doctors determined the impact injury sustained to her right leg was beyond repair resulting in amputation.

There was an outpouring of support after the accident from both the Austin and music communities. Welch's first public appearance was at the "Eye Love Savannah" benefit November 28, 2016 organized by Austin photographer Todd Wolfson. A “Stand with Savannah” benefit concert was held in Nashville, Tennessee December 13, 2016 with Savannah's father, country music artist Kevin Welch, reuniting with his old band Dead Reckoners. Emmylou Harris also attended. On December 23, 2016, there was a "Standing Beside Savannah" Benefit Auction at the Continental Club in Austin held during the Legends & Legacies Holiday Show, which featured multi-generation family collaborations from Austin musical families performing, including Welch's brother Dustin and father Kevin, James McMurty, John Dee Graham, and Charlie Sexton.

Filmography

Discography

Awards and nominations

Acting

Music

References

External links
 
 The Trishas official website
 

American television actresses
Living people
Actresses from Austin, Texas
1984 births
American film actresses
Amputee actors
21st-century American actresses
21st-century American women musicians
Musicians from Austin, Texas